is a Japanese singer-songwriter who debuted under Sony Music Entertainment Japan in 2010.

Biography 

Rake was born in Sendai, Japan. He began an interest in music by playing an antique guitar at his family home, and in high school, was a member of a hard rock band. In university, Rake considered singing for the first time, and began steps to becoming a professional musician.

Rake performed as the opening act to Japanese band Kimaguren's 2009 tour Kid in the Sky, and the following January debuted under Sony Music Japan, with the single "Fly Away." The song was used as the theme song for the Tokyo MX drama Taxmen, and while few copies were sold, the song received such extremely heavy airplay across Japan that it topped Billboard'''s Japan Hot 100 chart for two weeks. Rake, after releasing his debut extended play All You Need Is'', performed his first solo concert in July, followed by performances at summer festival Summer Sonic in August.

In 2011, Rake had his first hit single, "Hyakuman-kai no 'I Love You'," which was used in a television commercial campaign for Yokohama Tire. The song was successful on the RIAJ Digital Track Chart in its first week, debuting at number six. However, due to the 2011 Tōhoku earthquake and tsunami occurring several days after the single's physical release in Rake's hometown, many promotional events for the song were cancelled. Rake was at his home in Sendai at the time of the earthquake.

In 2015 he went into retirement as a singer-songwriter until 2018 when he resumed under a new project called "Samurai Japan Project".

Discography

Album

Extended play

Singles

Other charted songs

References

External links 
 Official site 
 Official Sony Music Japan label site 
 Official blog 

Living people
Japanese male musicians
Japanese male pop singers
Japanese male singer-songwriters
Japanese singer-songwriters
Japanese-language singers
People from Sendai
Sony Music Entertainment Japan artists
1979 births
Musicians from Miyagi Prefecture
21st-century Japanese singers
21st-century Japanese male singers